Self-study programs allow learning without having a teacher present, and the courses can supplement or replace classroom instruction. Universities use self-study programs for less-commonly taught languages, where having professors is not feasible. Self-study programs are available on paper, audio files, video files, smartphone apps, computers, or any combination. 

This list is limited to programs that teach four or more languages. There are many others that teach one language.

Alphabetical lists of languages show the courses available to learn each language, at All Language Resources, Lang1234, Martindale's Language Center, Omniglot, and Rüdiger Köppe. (UCLA Language Materials Project has ended.) For the thousands of languages not listed on those sites, for which no course exists, Global Recordings Network has recorded a standard set of Bible stories in 6,000 languages. With effort, learners can study any language by comparing their recordings to the same story in a language they know.

The list of self-study programs, below, shows the number of languages taught by each program, the name of the program, and the number of different languages used for instruction. Multiple languages of instruction may be available for some but not all courses. For example, Reise Know-How uses 6 languages to teach German, but only German to teach the other languages. On the other hand Eurotalk, Pronunciator and 50Languages use all languages to teach all the other languages.

References

Applied linguistics
Language acquisition
Language education
Language learning software
Learning methods
Language education materials
Language education publishing companies
Language-teaching methodology
Language-teaching techniques
Second-language acquisition
Pedagogy
Self-study programs